Didier Guzzoni (born 1970 in Geneva) is a Swiss computer scientist and senior software engineer with the Apple's Siri team. He was a founding member and chief scientist at the start-up company Siri Inc. that was later acquired be Apple Inc.

Career 
Guzzoni studied electrical engineering at the Geneva State Engineering School, followed by studies in computer science at EPFL, where obtained a master's degree in 1996. He then worked with Charles Baur on medical robotics application at EPFL's Virtual Reality and Active Interface group. In 1997, he moved to Silicon Valley to  join  the SRI International's Artificial Intelligence Center to work with Luc Julia and Adam Cheyer at on artificial intelligence and robotics. Then he was involved in multiple start-ups ranging from mobile robotics to AI-powered B2B platforms, where he collaborated among others with Rajiv Gupta and Shamik Sharma.

In 2004, he returned to EPFL to join Charles Baur's laboratory as a PhD student. His research aimed at facilitating the access on complex artificial intelligence techniques by software developers.

After his graduation in 2007, together with Tom Gruber and Dag Kittlaus he cofounded and became chief scientist Siri Inc., a start-up company developing a mobile intelligent assistant. The company was acquired in 2010 by Apple Inc., and its technology has been incorporated with most Apple products since 2011. He is a senior software engineer with the Apple's Siri team.

Selected works 
Journal papers
 
 
 
Thesis
 
Patent

References

External links 
 Website of Apple Inc.

1970 births
Living people
Academic staff of the École Polytechnique Fédérale de Lausanne
Computer scientists
Apple Inc.